El Casar is a municipality located in the province of Guadalajara, Castile-La Mancha, Spain. 

Located in the border with the Community of Madrid, in the route of the N-320 road, it lies at 833 metres above sea level. The municipality covers an area of 51.84 km2.

 it has a population of 11,812. El Casar is one of the municipalities in the province that experienced a great population increase in the late 20th century, in parallel to a huge increase in the urbanised area, through low-density residential developments, initially intended mainly for second homes. The population has roughly multiplied tenfold during the 1981–2011 period.

References 

Municipalities in the Province of Guadalajara